Rudolf Kern was an important designer and builder in Bydgoszcz, at the end of the Prussian period of the city. Most his works have been realized between 1903 and 1914. His artistic style relates to Art Nouveau and Modernism.

Life
Rudolf Kern allegedly practised in the studio of Józef Święcicki.
From 1903 to the beginning of the 1920s, he his own architectural and construction office. At that time, like many architects from Bydgoszcz, he was involved in the design and construction of tenement houses that were then sold to profitable real estate brokers. This process was particularly noticeable in the erection of edifices along Cieszkowskiego Street.

In Bydgoszcz, he lived until 1922 in his own house at the corner of Gdańska Street and Adam Mickiewicz Alley

Style
Rudolf Kern's style is characterized by Art Nouveau features and details.

In 1912, one of his projects was awarded most beautiful new building of the year (together with Fritz Weidner's house at Kołłątaja street 1), in a competition organized by city authorities: it stands at 20 January 1920 Street 24.

Works in Bydgoszcz

See also

 Bydgoszcz
 Bydgoszcz Architects (1850-1970s)
 List of Polish people

References

Bibliography
 
 
 
 
 
 
 

19th-century Polish architects
20th-century Polish architects
Architects from Bydgoszcz